The Murlocs are an Australian rock band from Melbourne. They are composed of Ambrose Kenny-Smith on vocals and harmonica, Cal Shortal on guitar, Cook Craig on bass guitar, Tim Karmouche on keyboards, and Matt Blach on drums. They were formed in 2011 by Ambrose Kenny-Smith, and they have released six studio albums since then. They are signed to Flightless Records, and many of the band members are a part of other bands signed to Flightless, including King Gizzard & the Lizard Wizard and ORB. Their sound is a mix of rock and R&B, with the distorted harmonica of Kenny-Smith providing the band with a distinctive sound.

History 
The Murlocs were formed in 2010 in Ocean Grove, Geelong, Australia. According to Ambrose Kenny-Smith, their name was derived from the mythology of the oracle. In Kenny-Smith's words, "A murloc ... is a mythical creature that fiends for the oracle". They released their first EP, their self-titled project The Murlocs, in March 2012. This was followed closely by another EP, Tee Pee, in August 2012. Their first full studio album, Loopholes, was released in 2014 under the Flightless Records label. Halfway through the recording of the album, the laptop containing the tracks was stolen, and the band had to re-record most of it. In 2015, The Murlocs joined King Gizzard & the Lizard Wizard for all three stops of the inaugural Gizzfest festival tour. They would play at the annual festival every year until 2018, when the festival went on hiatus.

Their second album, Young Blindness, was released in March 2016. The album's second single, "Rolling On", was released in September 2015. "Rolling On" was a breakthrough for The Murlocs, and the song continues to be one of their most popular to date. Young Blindness was followed in 2017 by The Murlocs' third album, Old Locomotive, which included the singles "Noble Soldier" and "Oblivion". Old Locomotive gave the band its first chart appearance when it debuted at #15 on the ARIA album charts. In another first, the band toured Europe for the first time in late 2017.

Manic Candid Episode, released in March 2019, was the band's fourth studio album. Kenny-Smith described this album as "...definitely the most lush thing we have done". The album's earned the band its second chart appearance when it reached #16 on the ARIA album charts. In support of the album, the band began their first headlining tour of the United States in April 2019. Ohtis accompanied them for this tour as the opening act.

On 20 April 2021, they announced their fifth studio album Bittersweet Demons, due 25 June 2021, and released the first single "Francesca". About the single, Kenny-Smith said that “it's probably the most positive, feel-good song we’ve ever done. It's also the closest we’ve ever come to having an 80s phase.” In a YouTube Q&A, the Kenny-Smith stated that Bittersweet Demons is "very personal to me as every song is based upon different places I grew up and certain family members and friends that are close". Drummer Matt Blach also said that they "...have experimented a lot more with this album than others."

Also on 20 April, they released vinyl re-pressings of Loopholes and the Tee Pee and Self Titled EPs, the latter of which had never been released on vinyl before.

On 12 July 2022, the band announced their sixth album, Rapscallion, which was released on 16 September of the same year.

Members 
Current members:
 Ambrose Kenny-Smith – lead vocals, harmonica, percussion, keyboards, guitar (2011–present)
 Cal Shortal – guitar, backing vocals (2011–present)
 Matt Blach – drums, backing vocals (2011–present)
 Cook Craig – bass, guitar (2013–present) 
 Tim Karmouche – keyboards, guitar, vocals (2016–present)

Former members:
 Jamie Harmer – guitar, backing vocals (2011–2013)
 Andrew Crossley – bass guitar (2011–2013)
 Mladen Milinkovic – guitar, backing vocals (2015–2016)

Discography

Studio albums

Extended plays

Music videos

Awards and nominations

Music Victoria Awards
The Music Victoria Awards are an annual awards night celebrating Victorian music. They commenced in 2006.

! 
|-
| Music Victoria Awards of 2015
| The Murlocs
| Best Regional Act
| 
|rowspan="2"|  
|-
| Music Victoria Awards of 2016
| The Murlocs
| Best Regional Act
| 
|-

References 

Australian garage rock groups
Australian psychedelic rock music groups
Musical groups established in 2010
Musical groups from Melbourne
Musical quintets
2010 establishments in Australia
Musical groups from Geelong